Because of its unique history, many of the boundaries of the political divisions of the United States were artificially constructed (rather than permitted to evolve and drawn using natural features of the landscape). Therefore, many U.S. states have straight lines as boundaries, especially in the West. However, there are many partial state boundaries, particularly in the Midwest, Northeast, and South, that are defined by rivers; in fact, only five states (Colorado, Hawaii, Montana, Utah, and Wyoming) completely lack any borders defined by rivers or waterways.

The rule of the thread of the channel and its exceptions 

River boundaries are typically defined by the "thread of the channel" (the river's thalweg, usually in the approximate middle of the river's channel), under a rule that the United States inherited from England, where it applies to boundaries between counties. In the United States, there are at least six exceptions, however, where the boundary is one bank of the river rather than the thread of the channel:

 The boundary between New Hampshire and Vermont is the west bank of the Connecticut River. This was established as the eastern boundary of New York by a grant of King Charles II in 1664. It was disregarded by Governor Benning Wentworth of New Hampshire, who treated the New Hampshire Grants west of the river as a de facto part of New Hampshire during the years 1649–1764, but King George III put an end to that in 1764. In August 1781, the Continental Congress decided it would recognize the then largely unrecognized state of Vermont, which had been organized in defiance of New York, on condition that Vermont would agree to certain boundaries. In 1782, the legislature of Vermont agreed, but nonetheless Vermont was not admitted to the Union until 1791. In 1933, citing the 1782 legislation, the United States Supreme Court denied the petition from the state of Vermont to make the boundary the thread of the channel.
 The boundaries between Kentucky and West Virginia and the three states to their north – Ohio, Indiana, and Illinois – is based on the historical northern bank of the Ohio River. In 1763, Britain defeated France in the Seven Years' War, whose North American theater was called the French and Indian War. At that time, Canada, which had been a French colony, became a British colony, and Parliament made the north bank of the Ohio the southern boundary of Canada. The river was thus included in the district of Kentucky, which was then a part of Virginia. In January 1980, the U.S. Supreme Court ruled in Ohio v. Kentucky that the state line is the low-water mark of the Ohio River's north shore as of Kentucky's admission to the Union in 1792. Because both damming and natural changes have rendered the 1792 shore virtually undetectable in many places, the exact boundary was decided in the 1990s in settlements among the states.
 The boundary between Delaware and New Jersey north of 39° 30' north latitude is the east bank of the Delaware River.
 The boundary between Delaware and New Jersey south of a certain point is the west bank of the Delaware River, rather than the thread of the channel.
 The boundary between Maryland and Virginia is the south bank of the Potomac River. This also applies both to the border between Maryland and West Virginia (from Harper's Ferry to the source of the Potomac near the Fairfax Stone) since the latter was at one point part of Virginia, and to the border between Virginia and Washington, D.C., since the capital was established from a section of Maryland property.
 The boundary between Alabama and Georgia, south of West Point, Georgia, is the west bank of the Chattahoochee River at the mean water mark. This was established in an 1860 Supreme Court ruling, Alabama v. Georgia.

List of river borders 

 Arthur Kill: New Jersey, New York (tidal strait)
 Big Sandy River: Kentucky, West Virginia
 Big Sioux River: South Dakota, Iowa
 Blackwater River: Virginia, North Carolina
 Bois de Sioux River: South Dakota, Minnesota, North Dakota
 Brule River: Michigan, Wisconsin
 Byram River: Connecticut, New York
 Catawba River: North Carolina, South Carolina
 Chattahoochee River: Alabama, Florida, Georgia
 Chattooga River:  Georgia, South Carolina
 Colorado River: Arizona, Nevada, California, Baja California
 Columbia River: Washington, Oregon
 Connecticut River: New Hampshire, Vermont
 Delaware River: New York, Pennsylvania, New Jersey, Delaware
 Des Moines River: Iowa, Missouri
 Detroit River: Michigan, Ontario
 Great Miami River (mouth only): Ohio, Indiana
 Halls Stream: New Hampshire, Quebec
 Hudson River (lower part only): New Jersey, New York
 Kill Van Kull: New Jersey, New York (tidal strait)
 Menominee River: Michigan, Wisconsin
 Mississippi River: Minnesota, Wisconsin, Iowa, Illinois, Missouri, Kentucky, Tennessee, Arkansas, Mississippi, and Louisiana
 Missouri River: South Dakota, Nebraska, Iowa, Missouri, Kansas
 Montreal River: Michigan (Upper Peninsula), Wisconsin
 Niagara River: New York, Ontario
 Ohio River: Illinois, Indiana, Ohio, Kentucky, West Virginia
 Palmer River: Rhode Island, Massachusetts
 Pawcatuck River: Connecticut, Rhode Island
 Pearl River: Mississippi, Louisiana
 Perdido River: Florida, Alabama
 Pigeon River: Minnesota, Ontario
 Pine River: Minnesota, Ontario
 Piscataqua River: Maine, New Hampshire
 Pocomoke River: Maryland, Virginia
 Poteau River: Arkansas, Oklahoma
 Potomac River: Maryland, Virginia, D.C., West Virginia
 Poultney River: Vermont, New York
 Rainy River: Minnesota, Ontario
 Red River of the North: North Dakota, Minnesota
 Red River of the South: Texas, Oklahoma, Arkansas
 Rio Grande: New Mexico, Texas, Chihuahua, Coahuila, Nuevo León, Tamaulipas
 Runnins River: Rhode Island, Massachusetts
 Sabine River: Texas, Louisiana
 St. Clair River: Michigan, Ontario
 St. Croix River (Maine-New Brunswick): Maine, New Brunswick
 St. Croix River (Wisconsin-Minnesota): Minnesota, Wisconsin
 St. Francis River (Missouri-Arkansas): Arkansas, Missouri
 St. Francis River (Quebec-Maine): Maine, Quebec
 St. John River: Maine, New Brunswick
 St. Lawrence River: New York, Ontario
 St. Louis River: Minnesota, Wisconsin
 St. Marys River (Florida-Georgia): Florida, Georgia
 St. Marys River (Michigan-Ontario): Michigan, Ontario
 Salmon Falls River: New Hampshire, Maine
 Savannah River: South Carolina, Georgia
 Snake River: Idaho, Washington, Oregon
 Tennessee River: Kentucky, Tennessee, Mississippi, Alabama
 Tug Fork River: Kentucky, West Virginia, Virginia
 Tugaloo River: Georgia, South Carolina
 Wabash River: Illinois, Indiana

The course of the Charles River was used to indirectly define the border between Massachusetts and Rhode Island.  The Merrimack River defines part of the border between Massachusetts and New Hampshire, which runs parallel to the river, three miles north of it (see Northern boundary of Massachusetts.)

References

Geography of the United States

Borders of U.S. states